Why Can't We Be Friends? is the seventh studio album by American band War, released on June 16, 1975 by United Artists Records. Two singles from the album were released: the title track backed with "In Mazatlan", and "Low Rider" backed with "So". Both A-sides were nominated for the Grammy Awards of 1976.

Of the songs on this album, an interpolation of the first part of the song "Smile Happy" was used in the song "It Wasn't Me" by Shaggy featuring RikRok. Versions of the album's titular song has been used in several film productions, notably Bridge to Terabithia and Wild Things.

Track listing
All tracks composed by War (Papa Dee Allen, Harold Brown, B.B. Dickerson, Lonnie Jordan, Charles Miller, Lee Oskar, Howard E. Scott), except where indicated.
Note: The CD edition does not break "Leroy's Latin Lament" into sections.

"Don't Let No One Get You Down" (War, Jerry Goldstein) – 3:59
"Lotus Blossom" (War, Francie Nelson) – 3:59
"Heartbeat" – 7:25
"Leroy's Latin Lament (Medley)" - 6:36
"Lonnie Dreams" – 0:49
"The Way We Feel" (War, lyrics: Keri Oskar) – 1:10
"La Fiesta" – 2:10
"Lament" – 2:27
"Smile Happy" – 7:22
"So" – 4:58
"Low Rider" (War, Jerry Goldstein) – 3:11
"In Mazatlan" – 2:45
"Why Can't We Be Friends?" (War, Jerry Goldstein) – 3:49

Personnel
War
Howard Scott – guitar, percussion, vocals
B. B. Dickerson – bass, percussion, vocals
Lonnie Jordan – organ, piano, timbales, percussion, vocals
Harold Brown – drums, percussion, vocals (credit missing from LP cover)
Papa Dee Allen – conga, bongos, percussion, vocals
Charles Miller – clarinet, alto, tenor and baritone saxophones, percussion, vocals
Lee Oskar – harmonica, percussion, vocals

Charts

See also
List of Billboard number-one R&B albums of 1975

References

External links
Why Can't We Be Friends? at Discogs

1975 albums
War (American band) albums
United Artists Records albums
Albums produced by Jerry Goldstein (producer)